The 2001 European Beach Volleyball Championship were held from September 6 to September 9, 2001 in Jesolo, near Venice, Italy. It was the ninth official edition of the men's event, which started in 1993, while the women competed for the eighth time.

Men's competition
 A total number of 24 participating couples

Women's competition
 A total number of 24 participating couples

References
 Beach Volleyball Results
 

2001
E
B
B